Chanticleer Garden is a forty-eight-acre botanical garden built on the grounds of the Rosengarten estate at 786 Church Road in Wayne, Pennsylvania. Located on Philadelphia's historic Main Line, Chanticleer retains a domestic scale and is welcoming to visitors for relaxation, walking, and picnics. The grounds became open to the public in 1993. Visitors are welcome to tour the estate seasonally, from April through October. The house and grounds were added to the National Register of Historic Places in 1984.

History
The estate was built in 1912 as a summer cottage for Christine Penrose and Adolph G. Rosengarten Sr., the latter of whom was the head of Rosengarten & Sons, a Philadelphia pharmaceutical manufacturer that his family had founded in 1822 to produce quinine. The company later merged with Merck & Co in 1927. Upon inheriting the estate, their son, Adolph G. Rosengarten Jr.  established a foundation to ensure that Chanticleer would be developed as a public garden.

The name Chanticleer is derived from the French word for rooster, "chanticleer" . The entrance gate is crested with carved stone rooster and other references to roosters can be found throughout the estate. Adolph G. Rosengarten Jr. hired Christopher Woods, a native of Britain, to develop the garden. After Rosengarten, Jr.'s death in 1990, Woods became the founding Executive Director and began a radical revision of the garden. He tore down Mr. Rosengarten's stone house to create what is now known as "The Ruin".

Chanticleer consists of a collection of open lawns and large trees. Different sections of the botanical gardens include:
 Chanticleer House, the Main House, connecting to the entrance and Teacup Garden, which includes an open air porch, providing a popular spot for visitors to sit and relax
 Asian Woods, planting for which began in 1995, after being cleared the previous year, and now hosting a variety of species native to Korea, Japan, and China, but in the style of an American woodland garden
 Pond Garden, a large man-made circular pond constructed in the early 1970s, acting as a mirror for the trees that surround it
 Teacup Garden, a small-scale garden serving as the entrance courtyard to the property
 Minder Woods, a heavily vegetated area with towering red oaks and dark green pines, firs, false cypresses, and hemlocks, accessible via meandering stone paths
Tennis Court Garden, estate's old tennis court, transformed into a dynamic garden
 "The Ruin" Garden, the Minder House, built in 1925 and razed in 1999 to offer a series of spaces, pools, and fountains
 Gravel Garden, small garden spaces, connected by a series of steps, and home to a variety of species of plants that are rare to the area and climate
 Cutting Garden, a traditional cottage garden with a series of arches, fashioned from rebar and driftwood, providing venues for clematis and annual vines
 Vegetable garden, where rustic benches help frame a simple traditional American vegetable garden
 Bell's Run, with adjacent woods giving way to undulating lawns, a stream, and a functional 1940s waterwheel
Bell's Woodland, a naturalistic garden devoted to plants indigenous to the eastern U.S.
Bulb Meadow, on a hillside, highlighted by Spanish bluebells and fragile daffodils

The grounds

See also

 List of botanical gardens in the United States

References

External links
 Chanticleer Garden
 Chanticleer: A Pleasure Garden by Adrian Higgins. Photographs by Rob Cardillo

Botanical gardens in Pennsylvania
Radnor Township, Delaware County, Pennsylvania
Houses on the National Register of Historic Places in Pennsylvania
Colonial Revival architecture in Pennsylvania
Houses completed in 1912
Protected areas of Delaware County, Pennsylvania
Houses in Delaware County, Pennsylvania
1912 establishments in Pennsylvania
National Register of Historic Places in Delaware County, Pennsylvania
Woodland gardens